IC 2177 is a region of nebulosity that lies along the border between the constellations Monoceros and Canis Major. It is a roughly circular H II region centered on the Be star HD 53367. This nebula was discovered by Welsh amateur astronomer Isaac Roberts and was described by him as "pretty bright, extremely large, irregularly round, very diffuse."

The name Seagull Nebula is sometimes applied by amateur astronomers to this emission region, although it more properly includes the neighboring regions of star clusters, dust clouds and reflection nebulae. This latter region includes the open clusters NGC 2335 and NGC 2343.

NGC 2327 is located in IC 2177. It is also known as the Seagull's Head, due to its larger presence in the Seagull nebula.

Gallery

References

External links

 
 The flight of the Seagull Nebula, February 6, 2013, Thomas Anderson, TG Daily

H II regions
2177
Star-forming regions
Monoceros (constellation)